Richard Eugene Guesman (January 22, 1938 – September 12, 2006) was a professional American football player who played defensive lineman for the New York Jets and Denver Broncos.

After retirement, he resided in Roswell, Georgia (north of Atlanta) and was a practicing Roman Catholic. His widow is active in the faith.

References

1938 births
2006 deaths
American football defensive linemen
New York Titans (AFL) players
New York Jets players
Denver Broncos (AFL) players
West Virginia Mountaineers football players
People from Roswell, Georgia
People from Brownsville, Pennsylvania
Sportspeople from Fulton County, Georgia
Sportspeople from the Pittsburgh metropolitan area
Players of American football from Pennsylvania
American Football League players
Catholics from Pennsylvania
Catholics from Georgia (U.S. state)